This is a list of American television-related events in 1976.

Events

Programs
 signifies that this show has a related event in the Events section above.

ABC
American Bandstand (1952–1989)
The Edge of Night (1956–1984)
General Hospital (1963–present)
One Life to Live (1968–2012)
All My Children (1970–2011)
Monday Night Football (1970–present)
Schoolhouse Rock! (1973–1996)
The Six Million Dollar Man (1973–1978)
Happy Days (1974–1984)
Baretta (1975–1978)
Barney Miller (1975–1982)
Good Morning America (1975–present)
Ryan's Hope (1975–1989)
Tom and Jerry (1965–1972, 1975–1977, 1980–1982)
Welcome Back, Kotter (1975–1979)
Charlie's Angels (1976–1981)
CBS
Love of Life (1951–1980)
Search for Tomorrow (1951–1986)
The Guiding Light (1952–2009)
Face the Nation (1954–present)
Captain Kangaroo (1955–1984)
As the World Turns (1956–2010)
The Carol Burnett Show (1967–1978)
60 Minutes (1968–present)
Hawaii Five-O (1968–1980)
The Mary Tyler Moore Show (1970–1977)
All in the Family (1971–1979)
The Bob Newhart Show (1972–1978)
Fat Albert and the Cosby Kids (1972–1984)
M*A*S*H (1972–1983)
Maude (1972–1978)
The Price Is Right (1972–present)
The Waltons (1972–1981)
Barnaby Jones (1973–1980)
Kojak (1973–1978, 2005–present)
Match Game '76 (1962–1969, 1973–1984, 1990–1991, 1998–1999, 2016−2021)
The Young and the Restless (1973–present)
Good Times (1974–1979)
Rhoda (1974–1978)
Tattletales (1974–1978, 1982–1984)
The Jeffersons (1975–1985)
Phyllis (1975–1977)
One Day at a Time (1975–1984)
NBC
Meet the Press (1947–present)
The Today Show (1952–present)
The Tonight Show Starring Johnny Carson (1962–1992)
The Doctors (1963–1982)
Another World (1964–1999)
Days of Our Lives (1965–present)
Kimba the White Lion (1966–1967) reruns.
The Wonderful World of Disney (1969–1979)
McCloud (1970–1977)
McMillan & Wife (1971–1977)
Emergency! (1972–1977)
Sanford and Son (1972–1977)
The Tomorrow Show (1973–1982)
Chico and the Man (1974–1978)
Columbo (1971–1978)
Dean Martin Celebrity Roast (1974–1984)
Little House on the Prairie (1974–1983)
Police Woman (1974–1978)
The Rockford Files (1974–1980)
Saturday Night Live (1975–present)
Wheel of Fortune (1975–present)
PBS
Sesame Street (1969–present)
The Electric Company (1971–1977)
Masterpiece Theatre (1971–present)
Nova (1974–present)
Clyde Frog Show (1974–1976)
In syndication
Candid Camera (1948–2014)
Truth or Consequences (1950–1988)
The Lawrence Welk Show (1955–1982)
The Mike Douglas Show (1961–1981)
Hee Haw (1969–1993)
Soul Train (1971–2006)
Dinah! (1974–1980)
Match Game PM (1975–1981)

Debuting this year
{| class="wikitable sortable"
|-
! Date
! Show
! Network
|-
| January 13
| The Adams Chronicles
|PBS
|-
| January 14
| The Bionic Woman
|ABC
|-
| January 21
| Dance in America
|PBS
|-
| January 27
| Laverne & Shirley
|ABC
|-
| January 28
| The Dumplings
|rowspan="3"|NBC
|-
| January 30
| The Practice
|-
| February 2
| Jigsaw John
|-
| February 13
| Sara| CBS
|-
| March 9
| Family|rowspan="2"|ABC
|-
| May 31
| Viva Valdez|-
| June 14
| The Gong Show|NBC
|-
| July 12
| Family Feud|rowspan="2"|ABC
|-
| August 5
| What's Happening!!|-
| August 14
| Clue Club|CBS
|-
| August 30
| New Howdy Doody Show|Syndication
|-
| August 31
| Alice|CBS
|-
| September 6
| In Search of...|Syndication
|-
| September 9
| Delvecchio|rowspan="4"|CBS
|-
|rowspan="13"| September 11
| Ark II|-
| Tarzan, Lord of the Jungle|-
| Way Out Games|-
| Big John, Little John|rowspan="5"|NBC
|-
| The Kids From C.A.P.E.R.|-
| McDuff, the Talking Dog|-
| Monster Squad|-
| Muggsy|-
| Jabberjaw|rowspan="5"|ABC
|-
| The Krofft Supershow|-
| The Mumbly Cartoon Show|-
| The Scooby-Doo Show|-
| The Scooby-Doo/Dynomutt Hour|-
| September 17
| Spencer's Pilots|CBS
|-
| September 19
| Cos|ABC
|-
|rowspan="2"| September 20
| All's Fair|CBS
|-
|The Muppet Show|Syndication 
|-
|rowspan="2"| September 21
| Rich Man, Poor Man Book II|ABC
|-
| Baa Baa Black Sheep|rowspan="2"|NBC
|-
|rowspan="3"| September 22
| The Quest|-
| Ball Four|CBS
|-
| Charlie's Angels|rowspan="2"|ABC
|-
|rowspan="2"| September 23
| The Tony Randall Show|-
| Gemini Man|rowspan="2"|NBC
|-
| September 24
| Serpico|-
|rowspan="2"| September 25
| Holmes & Yo-Yo|rowspan="3"|ABC
|-
| Mr. T and Tina|-
| September 30
| The Nancy Walker Show|-
| October 3
| Quincy, M.E.|rowspan="3"|NBC
|-
|rowspan="2"| October 4
| 50 Grand Slam|-
| Stumpers|-
| October 16
| Most Wanted|ABC
|-
| November 11
| Gibbsville|rowspan="4"|NBC
|-
|rowspan="3"| December 1
| C.P.O. Sharkey|-
| The McLean Stevenson Show|-
| Sirota's Court|-
| December 6
| The Feather and Father Gang| ABC
|-
| December 13
| Double Dare|CBS
|}

Ending this year

Television stations

Station launches

Network affiliation changes

Station closures

Births

Deaths

Television debuts
Rick Moranis – SCTVKim Cattrall – Dead on TargetJane Pauley – TodayJeffrey Jones – The Adams ChroniclesKim Basinger – Gemini ManDave Thomas – SCTVRay Winstone – The SweeneyDeidre Hall – Days of Our LivesJonathan Banks – Barnaby JonesHarold Ramis – SCTV''

See also
 1976 in the United States
 List of American films of 1976

References

External links 
List of 1976 American television series at IMDb